Akari Oumi (近江 あかり, Oumi Akari, born 10 November 1989) is a Japanese volleyball player who retired from the NEC Red Rockets after the 2016-2017 season. She also played for Japan women's national volleyball team.

Clubs 
  Kyoto Tachibana Highschool
  Tokai University
  NEC Red Rockets (2012-2017)

Awards

Individual 
 2012 Kurowashiki All Japan Volleyball Tournament - New Face Award
 2013 Japan V.Premier League - New Face Award (Rookie of the Year), Best6
 2014/15 Japan V.Premier League - MVP

Team
 2014/15 Japan V.Premier League -  Champion - NEC Red Rockets
 2016 Asian Women's Club Volleyball Championship in Biñan City, Philippines -  Champion - NEC Red Rockets
 2016/17 Japan V.Premier League -  Champion - NEC Red Rockets

National Team 
 2013 Asian Women's Seniors Volleyball Championship -  Silver medal
 2013 FIVB Women's World Grand Champions Cup -  Bronze medal

References

External links 
 FIVB - Biography
 V.League(Japan) - Biography

Japanese women's volleyball players
Sportspeople from Kyoto
1989 births
Living people
Tokai University alumni